Xanəgah, Nakhchivan may refer to:
Xanəgah, Julfa
Xanağa, Ordubad Rayon